Isobromindione is a drug used in the treatment of gout.

References

Bromoarenes
Indandiones